The Little Lame Prince and his Travelling Cloak (often published under its shorter title The Little Lame Prince) is a story for children written by Dinah Maria Mulock Craik and first published in 1875. In the story, the young Prince Dolor, whose legs are paralysed due to a childhood trauma, is exiled to a tower in a wasteland. As he grows older, a fairy godmother provides a magical travelling cloak so he can see, but not touch, the world. He uses this cloak to go on various adventures, and develops great wisdom and empathy in the process.  Finally he becomes a wise and compassionate ruler of his own land.

The author's style was to stimulate positive feelings in her young readers so that they would be motivated to adopt socially correct actions in whatever circumstances they encountered. She shows how imagination (mediated by the cloak) can lead to empathy and enlightened morality. However, some critics have found a deeper theme in this story, relating to the restricted lives of respectable middle-class British Victorian women that enforced helplessness.

Plot
On the day of Prince Dolor's baptism, there was a great procession. His well-to-do nurse was fiddling with her dress while holding the Prince and she dropped him, causing damage to his spine (probably). But she told no one. A fairy godmother appears to the Nurse and reveals she knows what happened. The Prince's Mother (the Queen) dies. The Prince's legs never grow strong. He cannot walk; he can only crawl with his arms. The King dies, too. The Regent family moves into the castle (with many kids) and the Prince's Uncle rules the kingdom. Things are good throughout the land, but Prince Dolor is ignored. The new King sends Dolor away and tells everyone that Dolor died.

Dolor is sent away to live in the lonely tower in the middle of a wasteland. There are no doors in the tower. It is 100 ft tall. But he has many books, toys and maps. His only companion is his nurse. And a deaf mute Black Knight brings them food and things. The Nurse is a 'prisoner', too. They use a ladder to get up into the tower. The Black Knight visits once a month. The Prince likes to be quiet and look out the window at the lonely plains. He does his lessons and schoolwork. He loves books.  He learns of the kingdom of Nomansland. But he feels that to read of things and never see them is sad. If only he could fly he wished. And he wishes he had someone who would be nice to him. He was lonely.

An old grey woman appears. She says I am your fairy godmother. Dolor asks, "Will you bring me a boy to play with?" She says no.  But gives him a gift: A travelling cloak. When the nurse comes into the room to see who he was talking to, she disappears. The cloak looks like a poncho. He didn't know the magic powers it holds.

One day he gets sick and his fairy godmother comes to visit. He asks her why he can't walk. She tells him he will never walk.  He is sad. She asks where is your cloak? He had put it in the closet. She teaches him how to use it with the magic words and reminds him to open the skylight.

When he says the magic words it grows bigger. At first he forgets the words that make it fly. And he forgets to open the skylight. When he was finally out flying around the tower, he felt wonderful. But he saw only dreary planes, the stars and moon. He got very cold. But he forgot the magic words that would take him home. The cloak took him faster and faster away from the tower. He became frightened. He calls out for his fairy godmother to please, please remind him of the magic words to bring him home. And he hears a voice tell him the word. When he gets home, he puts the cloak away and it shrinks and bundles itself up. The nurse didn't know he was gone, but is cross with him for leaving the skylight open. Its freezing in here!

When Prince Dolor went to bed that night he couldn't wait to go out flying again tomorrow. The next day, he did his lessons and schoolwork quickly and went out on the cloak again. He saw all kinds of flowers and trees and grass, birds and small animals that scurried away from him. He wished he could see better and his godmother sent him some spectacles.

He plays with his toys the next day and thinks about his toy horse and wishes he had a real horse. That night when he went out, he brought with him some food and water and a coat and he flew for a long time. He fell asleep while flying. When he awoke he was no longer in the wasteland. He was in the countryside. He saw rivers and hills, animals, trees, and even a waterfall. He wished he could hear everything better and his godmother sent him some silver ears that fit over his own. He wondered if he would see any people. He wished so much to have a little boy to play with. His flying cloak dipped lower and brought him closer to see a boy running in the field with his horse. As he watched, the little prince cried because he knew that he himself would never be able to run that way. Then a lark flew into his lap and he was happy again because this was such a strange and wonderful thing.

He wondered about his mother and father. He wondered what happened to them. The lark stayed with him and lived right outside his skylight.  He decided after seeing the running boy that he didn't want to fly around any more because it made him sad. A few months later he wondered if he will ever be the king as princes are supposed to. His nurse wrote on a paper "You ARE a king” and she finally wrote out his whole history for him. She was afraid to speak in case a spy heard her break the rule about not telling him.

That night he used the cloak and asked it to show him not what he wanted to see but “what I SHOULD see.”  The flying cloak took him to see the big city of Nomansland.  A magpie came to fly next to him and spoke to him with a strangely familiar voice.  The magpie shows him the palace – the biggest building he ever saw and showed him the regent King, his uncle – who had just died and was lying there looking like a wax figure.  The bird showed him that the town was beginning to revolt.  There was a revolution going on.  He saw terrible fighting in the streets.  He didn't want to see any more and he went home to his tower to sleep.  When he woke up re realised his nurse was gone.  He sees hoof prints outside his tower.  He realises that the Black Knight came and got the nurse and took her away.  He is alone in the tower for many days.

He almost runs out of food and is very sad and lonely when one morning he hears a trumpet.  A huge parade of people from the city had come to his tower.  They were singing and celebrating for they had heard that he was alive.  The nurse and the black night rode to the city to tell them about Prince Dolor.  He was crowned the new king.  He rules the city for many years.  When he gets old, he tells the people of the kingdom that he will leave and never come back.  He gets on his cloak (which no one ever saw before) and flies away.

Publication history
The novel was first published in 1875 in the UK by Daldy Isbister and Co., 56 Ludgate Hill, London. Printed by Virtue and Co., City Road, London. The first edition had a frontis piece and 23 engraved illustrations and was a hardback bound in green cloth, decorated in gilt and black with illustrations on the front and spine. All edges were gilded. Its publication followed Craik's popular novel John Halifax, Gentleman and this was stated on the cover. It has remained in publication since, with multiple editions.

Criticism
"I do not wholly approve Miss Mulloch's famous story of the 'Little Lame Prince,'" wrote L. Frank Baum in his essay, "Modern Fairy Tales," "for although it is charmingly written it is too pitiful in sentiment.  Doubtless many crippled children have derived a degree of comfort from the adventures of the little lame prince and his magic cloak; but a normal child should not be harassed with pitiful subjects, and even the maimed ones prefer to idolize the well and strong."

Explanation of the novel's title
The full title of the first edition is The Little Lame Prince and His Travelling Cloak – A Parable for Young and Old.

References

External links

 

1875 British novels
English novels
Children's fantasy novels
British children's novels
Fictional princes
Male characters in fairy tales
Child characters in fairy tales